Bogliasco (Official name: Bogliasco 1951) is an Italian water polo club from Bogliasco in Liguria. Currently it plays in Serie A1.

History 
Bogliasco was founded in 1951 as Rari Nantes Bogliasco. It plays in the A1 series, the Italian top division, for the first time in 1970.
In 1981 it won the Italian championship Serie A men's water polo,

Honours
 Men
  Italian League
 Winners (1):1981
 Runners-up (1): 1982
 Women
 Coppa Italia
 Winners (1): 2016

Famous players
  Eraldo Pizzo
  Vittorio Crovetto

References

External links 
 Official website

Water polo clubs in Liguria    
Water polo clubs in Italy
Sport in Liguria